The Well (Spanish: Manto acuífero) is a 2013 Mexican slice of life drama film by the Australian director Michael Rowe.

Plot
A little girl moves to a new home in another town with her mother and abusive stepfather, and suffers from missing her caring father.

Cast
 Tania Arredondo as Mamá
 Zaili Sofia Macias as Caro
 Arnoldo Picazzo as Felipe

References

External links
 

Mexican drama films
Films set in Mexico
2010s Spanish-language films
2013 films
2010s Mexican films
2013 drama films